Thomas Brokesby (by 1483–1544 or later), of the Inner Temple, London and Leicester, was an English politician.

He was a Member (MP) of the Parliament of England for Leicester in 1529 and Leicestershire 1542.

References

15th-century births
16th-century deaths
Members of the Parliament of England for Leicestershire
Politicians from Leicester
Members of the Inner Temple
English MPs 1529–1536
English MPs 1542–1544
16th-century English politicians